Carnevale in Adelaide is an annual Italian festival held in Adelaide, South Australia which follows the centuries-old Christian tradition of Carnevale which is the last celebration before Ash Wednesday and the beginning of Lent - see Carnival.

Background and History 
The first Carnevale in Adelaide was held in 1976 in Rundle Mall. A parade travelled from Victoria Square to Elder Park before ending with celebrations in Rundle Mall. It was originally called The Italian Festival and is now known as Carnevale in Adelaide. The festival has been held in a number of locations over the years including Rundle Mall,  Elder Park, Norwood and Adelaide Ovals, Rymill Park. In 2015 it was held at The Adelaide Showground

It is a means of inspiring young  people to embrace their Italian heritage and for the wider community to  experience Italian culture. The event also raises funds to cater for welfare needs of the elderly in the Italian community through the Co-ordinating Italian Committee (CIC) and supports other worthy charities and community organisations.

1976 
Inaugural Italian Festival held in Rundle Mall.

2007 
Held 10–11 February at Rymill Park.

2012 
Held 11–12 February at The Adelaide Showground.

2013 
Held 9–10 February at The Adelaide Showground.

2014 
Held 8–9 February at The Adelaide Showground.

2015 
Held 7–8 February at The Adelaide Showground.

2016 
Will be held 13–14 February at The Adelaide Showground.

Program 
The program includes live music, activities for children, dance, comedy, Mr and Miss Carnevale competition, fireworks, food and drink, cooking demonstrations, Italian cars on display, fashion parades, the national sausage making competition and screenings of Italian films and documentaries.

References

Festivals in Adelaide